Peabody Township Library, also known under the older name of Peabody Township Carnegie Library, was listed on the National Register of Historic Places (NRHP) in 1987.  It is located in the Downtown Historic District of Peabody, Kansas, United States.

History
In 1875, the original library was constructed.  The library was useful but within a few decades of use had become too small.

A committee of the Commercial Club, applied for a Carnegie library grant, and by the spring of 1913, the Carnegie Corporation had agreed to a grant of $10,000.  The building plan agreed upon will resemble that of the Carnegie library of Galena, Illinois.  The original library building was moved to the Peabody City Park, and the new Carnegie library was built on its site.  On April 18, 1914, the doors were open to the public.

Later, the original library was moved again and became the Peabody Historical Library Museum.

Since 2008, two computers have been available for high-speed T1 internet access, and free WiFi access allow patrons to browse the internet.  The library is a member of the North Central Kansas Libraries System, which provides an inter-library book loan service between its members.

Gallery

See also

 List of Carnegie libraries in Kansas
 National Register of Historic Places listings in Marion County, Kansas
 Peabody Downtown Historic District
 Peabody Historical Library Museum

References

Further reading

 The Peabody Gazette-Herald; February 12, 1913 / May 23, 1913 / August 6, 1913 / February 19, 1914 / April 16, 1914  / April 23, 1914.

External links

Peabody Township Carnegie Library (new library)
 Official Website
 
 
Peabody Historical Library Museum (old library)
 
 
Peabody Downtown Historic District (library is located in this district)
 
 
Maps
 Peabody City Map, KDOT
 Satellite view of Library, Google Map

Library buildings completed in 1914
Buildings and structures in Marion County, Kansas
Carnegie libraries in Kansas
Education in Marion County, Kansas
Libraries on the National Register of Historic Places in Kansas
Public libraries in Kansas
Historic district contributing properties in Kansas
National Register of Historic Places in Marion County, Kansas